From the Forest to the Sea is the fifth full-length recording by Southeast Engine, released in 2009 on Misra Records. The band recorded the album almost entirely live to analog tape in the abandoned auditorium of a middle school from the 19th century.

The album has been met mostly with critical praise. Review collation website Metacritic currently has From the Forest to the Sea listed at a weighted average of 84 percent.

This was the last album to feature keyboardist Michael Lachman; he was replaced by multi-instrumentalist Billy Matheny after his departure.

Track listing
 "The Forest Pt. I" – 3:02
 "The Forest Pt. II" – 3:23
 "The Forest Pt. III" – 3:09
 "Law-Abiding Citizen" – 2:56
 "Two of Every Kind" – 3:40
 "Black Gold" – 4:12
 "Easier Said Than Done" – 2:55
 "Quest for Noah's Ark" – 4:53
 "Preparing for the Flood" – 3:58
 "Malcontent" - 2:08
 "Sea of Galilee" - 3:57
 "From the Roots of Your Mountains to Your Holy Temple" – 4:20

All songs written and performed by Southeast Engine.

Personnel

Adam Remnant: vocals, guitar, harmonica
Jesse Remnant: bass, harmony vocals
Michael Lachman: piano, Wandering Genie, organ
Leo DeLuca: drums, percussion

References

Southeast Engine albums
2009 albums